Carmen Pagés-Serra (Barcelona, 1965) is the Chief of the Labor Markets Division of the Inter-American Development Bank (IDB).

Life
Pagés-Serra graduated in economics from the Universitat Autònoma de Barcelona and took her Ph.D. in economics from Boston University.

After working for the World Bank from 2004 to 2006, Pagés-Serra joined the IDB as a principal research economist at the Research Department and led publications such as The Age of Productivity: Transforming Economies from the Bottom Up. She is also the author of the book Law and Employment: Lessons from Latin America and the Caribbean jointly with the Nobel Laureate Prof. James Heckman and Job Creation in Latin America and the Caribbean: Recent Trends and Policy Challenges).

She has published extensively in leading academic and policy journals in the areas of labor markets, social security and productivity.

References

External links
 Labor Markets and Social Security Unit at the Inter-American Development Bank.
 List of Carmen Pagés-Serra's publications.
 Carmen Pagés-Serra at IDEAS

Spanish bankers
Spanish economists
Spanish women economists
Spanish social scientists
Labor economists
Living people
1965 births
People from Barcelona
Boston University College of Arts and Sciences alumni